Rodrigo Raineri (born 1969) is a Brazilian mountain climber and entrepreneur.

Raineri was born in Ibitinga. He graduated with a degree in engineering from Unicamp, and worked as a graduate school professor of ecotourism at Senac.In 2011, he was the first Brazilian to achieve a second ascent of Mount Everest. He has led 11 expeditions to Aconcagua, reaching the summit six times.

Raineri started climbing at 19. He has extensive experience in rock climbing, ice climbing and high mountain ascents. In 2009, he added paragliding to his repertory, flying down from the summit of Mont Blanc.

As an entrepreneur, Raineri provides corporate lectures and behavioral training, relating his mountaineering experience to the corporate world. He has worked since 1994 as an adventure sports and safety instructor. He is the co-author, along with Diogo Schelp, of No Teto do Mundo [At the Roof of the World] (Leya, 2012).

See also
Vitor Negrete (climbing partner who died on Everest)

References

External links
 

1969 births
Living people
Brazilian mountain climbers
State University of Campinas alumni
People from Ibitinga